Matilda Lo Keong (c.1856 – 18 December 1915) was a New Zealand storekeeper, homemaker and community worker. She was born in Bao'an District, China in c.1856. Lo Keong was the first identified Chinese female immigrant to New Zealand, where she raised the first known family of pure Chinese descent.

References

1850s births
1915 deaths
New Zealand social workers
New Zealand traders
Chinese emigrants to New Zealand
19th-century New Zealand people